The Hotel Arcata is a National Historic Place and fully operational hotel located in Arcata, California. It was built to accommodate visitors to Arcata, California, drawn by the Humboldt State Normal School (now Humboldt State University) and delivered by the Northwestern Pacific Railroad. In 1920 the Redwood Highway, US 101 provided more access to Arcata.

The hotel was renovated in the 1980s and was acquired by the Big Lagoon Rancheria, becoming the first off-reservation Native American-owned hotel in California.

See also
 Eureka Inn: another nearby historic hotel
 National Register of Historic Places listings in Humboldt County, California

References

External links

Hotel buildings on the National Register of Historic Places in California
Hotel buildings completed in 1914
Arcata, California
W. H. Weeks buildings
Arcata Hotel
Buildings and structures in Arcata, California
National Register of Historic Places in Humboldt County, California
1914 establishments in California